Borchgrevinkisen is a glacier flowing northward to the west of Taggen Nunatak, at the west end of the Sør Rondane Mountains. It was mapped by Norwegian cartographers in 1957 from air photos taken by U.S. Navy Operation Highjump, 1946–47, and named for Carsten E. Borchgrevink, Norwegian leader of the British Antarctic Expedition, 1898–1900.

See also
 List of glaciers in the Antarctic
 Glaciology

References

 

Glaciers of Queen Maud Land
Princess Ragnhild Coast